Qigong, qi gong, chi kung, chi 'ung, or chi gung is a system of coordinated body-posture and movement, breathing, and meditation used for the purposes of health, spirituality, and martial-arts training. With roots in Chinese medicine, philosophy, and martial arts, qigong is traditionally viewed by the Chinese and throughout Asia as a practice to cultivate and balance qi (pronounced approximately as "chee"), translated as "life energy".

Qigong practice typically involves moving meditation, coordinating slow-flowing movement, deep rhythmic breathing, and a calm meditative state of mind. People practice qigong throughout China and worldwide for recreation, exercise, relaxation, preventive medicine, self-healing, alternative medicine, meditation, self-cultivation, and training for martial arts.

Etymology

Qigong (Pinyin), ch'i kung (Wade-Giles), and chi gung (Yale) are Romanized words for two Chinese characters: qì (／) and gōng.

Qi (or chi) primarily means air, gas or breath but is often translated as a metaphysical concept of 'vital energy', referring to a supposed energy circulating through the body; though a more general definition is universal energy, including heat, light, and electromagnetic energy; and definitions often involve breath, air, gas, or the relationship between matter, energy, and spirit. Qi is the central underlying principle in traditional Chinese medicine and martial arts. Gong (or kung) is often translated as cultivation or work, and definitions include practice, skill, mastery, merit, achievement, service, result, or accomplishment, and is often used to mean gongfu (kung fu) in the traditional sense of achievement through great effort. The two words are combined to describe systems to cultivate and balance life energy, especially for health and wellbeing.

The term qigong as currently used was promoted in the late 1940s through the 1950s to refer to a broad range of Chinese self-cultivation exercises, and to emphasize health and scientific approaches, while de-emphasizing spiritual practices, mysticism, and elite lineages.

History and origins

With roots in ancient Chinese culture dating back more than 2,000 years, a wide variety of qigong forms have developed within different segments of Chinese society: in traditional Chinese medicine for preventive and curative functions; in Confucianism to promote longevity and improve moral character; in Taoism and Buddhism as part of meditative practice; and in Chinese martial arts to enhance self defending abilities. Contemporary qigong blends diverse and sometimes disparate traditions, in particular the Taoist meditative practice of "internal alchemy" (Neidan ), the ancient meditative practices of "circulating qi" (xingqi ) and "standing meditation" (Zhan zhuang ), and the slow gymnastic breathing exercise of "guiding and pulling" (Daoyin ). Traditionally, qigong was taught by master to students through training and oral transmission, with an emphasis on meditative practice by scholars and gymnastic or dynamic practice by the working masses.

Starting in the late 1940s and the 1950s, the mainland Chinese government tried to integrate disparate qigong approaches into one coherent system, with the intention of establishing a firm scientific basis for qigong practice. In 1949, Liu Guizhen established the name "Qigong" to refer to the system of life-preserving practices that he and his associates developed, based on Dao yin and other philosophical traditions. This attempt is considered by some sinologists as the start of the modern or scientific interpretation of qigong. During the Great Leap Forward (1958–1963) and the Cultural Revolution (1966–1976), qigong, along with other traditional Chinese medicine, was under tight control with limited access among the general public, but was encouraged in state-run rehabilitation centers and spread to universities and hospitals. After the Cultural Revolution, qigong, along with t'ai chi, was popularized as daily morning exercise practiced en masse throughout China.

Popularity of qigong grew rapidly during the Deng and Jiang eras after Mao Zedong's death in 1976 through the 1990s, with estimates of between 60 and 200 million practitioners throughout China. Along with popularity and state sanction came controversy and problems: claims of extraordinary abilities bordering on the supernatural, pseudoscience explanations to build credibility, a mental condition labeled qigong deviation, formation of cults, and exaggeration of claims by masters for personal benefit. In 1985, the state-run National Qigong Science and Research Organization was established to regulate the nation's qigong denominations. In 1999, in response to widespread revival of old traditions of spirituality, morality, and mysticism, and perceived challenges to State control, the Chinese government took measures to enforce control of public qigong practice, including shutting down qigong clinics and hospitals, and banning groups such as Zhong Gong and Falun Gong.
Since the 1999 crackdown, qigong research and practice have only been officially supported in the context of health and traditional Chinese medicine. The Chinese Health Qigong Association, established in 2000, strictly regulates public qigong practice, with limitation of public gatherings, requirement of state approved training and certification of instructors, and restriction of practice to state-approved forms.

Through the forces of migration of the Chinese diaspora, tourism in China, and globalization, the practice of qigong spread from the Chinese community to the world. Today, millions of people around the world practice qigong and believe in the benefits of qigong to varying degrees. Similar to its historical origin, those interested in qigong come from diverse backgrounds and practice it for different reasons, including for recreation, exercise, relaxation, preventive medicine, self-healing, alternative medicine, self-cultivation, meditation, spirituality, and martial arts training.

Overview

Practices
Qigong comprises a diverse set of practices that coordinate body, breath, and mind based on Chinese philosophy. Practices include moving and still meditation, massage, chanting, sound meditation, and non-contact treatments, performed in a broad array of body postures. Qigong is commonly classified into two foundational categories: 1) dynamic or active qigong (dong gong), with slow flowing movement; and 2) meditative or passive qigong (jing gong), with still positions and inner movement of the breath. From a therapeutic perspective, qigong can be classified into two systems:
1) internal qigong, which focuses on self-care and self-cultivation, and;
2) external qigong, which involves treatment by a therapist who directs or transmits qi.

As moving meditation, qigong practice typically coordinates slow stylized movement, deep diaphragmatic breathing, and calm mental focus, with visualization of guiding qi through the body. While implementation details vary, generally qigong forms can be characterized as a mix of four types of practice: dynamic, static, meditative, and activities requiring external aids.

 Dynamic practice
 involves fluid movement, usually carefully choreographed, coordinated with breath and awareness. Examples include the slow stylized movements of T'ai chi ch'uan, Baguazhang, and Xing Yi Quan. Other examples include graceful movement that mimics the motion of animals in Five Animals (Wu Qin Xi qigong), White Crane, and Wild Goose (Dayan) Qigong. As a form of gentle exercise, qigong is composed of movements that are typically repeated, strengthening and stretching the body, increasing fluid movement (blood, synovial, and lymph), enhancing balance and proprioception, and improving the awareness of how the body moves through space.

 Static practice
 involves holding postures for sustained periods of time. In some cases this bears resemblance to the practice of Yoga and its continuation in the Buddhist tradition. For example Yiquan, a Chinese martial art derived from xingyiquan, emphasizes static stance training. In another example, the healing form Eight Pieces of Brocade (Baduanjin qigong) is based on a series of static postures.

 Meditative practice
 utilizes breath awareness, visualization, mantra, chanting, sound, and focus on philosophical concepts such as qi circulation, aesthetics, or moral values. In traditional Chinese medicine and Daoist practice, the meditative focus is commonly on cultivating qi in dantian energy centers and balancing qi flow in meridian and other pathways. In various Buddhist traditions, the aim is to still the mind, either through outward focus, for example on a place, or through inward focus on the breath, a mantra, a koan, emptiness, or the idea of the eternal. In the Confucius scholar tradition, meditation is focused on humanity and virtue, with the aim of self-enlightenment.

 Use of external agents
 Many systems of qigong practice include the use of external agents such as ingestion of herbs, massage, physical manipulation, or interaction with other living organisms. For example, specialized food and drinks are used in some medical and Daoist forms, whereas massage and body manipulation are sometimes used in martial arts forms. In some medical systems a qigong master uses non-contact treatment, purportedly guiding qi through his or her own body into the body of another person.

Forms
There are numerous qigong forms. 75 ancient forms that can be found in ancient literature and also 56 common or contemporary forms have been described in a qigong compendium. The list is by no means exhaustive. Many contemporary forms were developed by people who had recovered from their illness after qigong practice.

Most of the qigong forms come under the following categories:
 Medical qigong
 Martial qigong
 Spiritual qigong
 Intellectual qigong
 Life nourishing qigong

Development of "health qigong" 
In 1995, there was Qigong Talent Bank, an organization of Science Research of Chinese Qigong, functioning as network system of the senior Chinese qigong talents in China. In order to promote qigong exercises in a standardised and effective way with a scientific approach, The Chinese Health Qigong Association (CHQA) appointed panels of Qigong experts, Chinese medicine doctors and sport science professors from different hospitals, universities and qigong lineage across China to research and develop new sets of qigong exercises. In 2003 the CHQA officially promoted a new system called "health qigong", which consisted of four newly developed health qigong forms:

 Health Qigong Muscle-Tendon Change Classic (Health Qigong Yì Jīn Jīng ).
 Health Qigong Five Animals Frolics (Health qigong Wu Qin Xi ).
 Health Qigong Six Healing Sounds (Health Qigong Liu Zi Jue ).
 Health Qigong Eight Pieces of Brocade (Health Qigong Ba Duan Jin ).

In 2010, the Chinese Health Qigong Association officially introduced five additional health qigong forms:

 Health Qigong Tai Chi Yang Sheng Zhang: a tai chi form from the stick tradition.
 Health Qigong Shi Er Duan Jin: seated exercises to strengthen the neck, shoulders, waist, and legs.
 Health Qigong Daoyin Yang Sheng Gong Shi Er Fa: 12 routines from Daoyin tradition of guiding and pulling qi.
 Health Qigong Mawangdui Daoyin: guiding qi along the meridians with synchronous movement and awareness.
 Health Qigong Da Wu: choreographed exercises to lubricate joints and guide qi.

Other commonly practised qigong styles and forms include:
 Soaring Crane Qigong
 Wisdom Healing Qigong
 Pan Gu Mystical Qigong
 Wild Goose (Dayan) Qigong
 Dragon and Tiger Qigong
 Primordial Qigong (Wujigong)
 Chilel Qigong
Phoenix Qigong
Yuan Qigong
Zhong Yuan Qigong

Techniques
Whether viewed from the perspective of exercise, health, philosophy, or martial arts training, several main principles emerge concerning the practice of qigong:

 Intentional movement: careful, flowing balanced style
 Rhythmic breathing: slow, deep, coordinated with fluid movement
 Awareness: calm, focused meditative state
 Visualization: of qi flow, philosophical tenets, aesthetics
 Chanting/Sound: use of sound as a focal point

Additional principles:

 Softness: soft gaze, expressionless face
 Solid Stance: firm footing, erect spine
 Relaxation: relaxed muscles, slightly bent joints
 Balance and Counterbalance: motion over the center of gravity

Advanced goals:

 Equanimity: more fluid, more relaxed
 Tranquility: empty mind, high awareness
 Stillness: smaller and smaller movements, eventually to complete stillness

The most advanced practice is generally considered to be with little or no motion.

Traditional and classical theory

Over time, five distinct traditions or schools of qigong developed in China, each with its own theories and characteristics: Chinese Medical Qigong, Daoist Qigong, Buddhist Qigong, Confucian Qigong, and Martial Qigong. All of these qigong traditions include practices intended to cultivate and balance qi.

Traditional Chinese medicine

The theories of ancient Chinese qigong include the Yin-Yang and Five Phases Theory, Essence-Qi-Spirit Theory, Zang-Xiang Theory, and Meridians and Qi-Blood Theory, which have been synthesized as part of Traditional Chinese Medicine (TCM). TCM focuses on tracing and correcting underlying disharmony, in terms of deficiency and excess, using the complementary and opposing forces of yin and yang, to create a balanced flow of qi. Qi is believed to be cultivated and stored in three main dantian energy centers and to travel through the body along twelve main meridians (Jīng Luò ), with numerous smaller branches and tributaries. The main meridians correspond to twelve main organs ) (Zàng fǔ ). Qi is balanced in terms of yin and yang in the context of the traditional system of Five Phases (Wu xing ). A person is believed to become ill or die when qi becomes diminished or unbalanced. Health is believed to be returned by rebuilding qi, eliminating qi blockages, and correcting qi imbalances. These TCM concepts do not translate readily to modern science and medicine.

Daoism
In Daoism, various practices now known as Daoist qigong are claimed to provide a way to achieve longevity and spiritual enlightenment, as well as a closer connection with the natural world. For instance, the Ming dynasty compendium Chifeng sui, written by a Daoist ascetic, lists various qigong-based "longevity methods".

Buddhism
In Buddhism meditative practices now known as Buddhist qigong are part of a spiritual path that leads to spiritual enlightenment or Buddhahood.

Confucianism
In Confucianism practices now known as Confucian qigong provide a means to become a Junzi through awareness of morality.

Contemporary qigong
In contemporary China, the emphasis of qigong practice has shifted away from traditional philosophy, spiritual attainment, and folklore, and increasingly to health benefits, traditional medicine and martial arts applications, and a scientific perspective. Qigong is now practiced by millions worldwide, primarily for its health benefits, though many practitioners have also adopted traditional philosophical, medical, or martial arts perspectives, and even use the long history of qigong as evidence of its effectiveness.

Contemporary Chinese medical qigong
Qigong has been recognized as a "standard medical technique" in China since 1989, and is sometimes included in the medical curriculum of major universities in China. The 2013 English translation of the official Chinese Medical Qigong textbook used in China defines CMQ as "the skill of body-mind exercise that integrates body, breath, and mind adjustments into one" and emphasizes that qigong is based on "adjustment" (tiao , also translated as "regulation", "tuning", or "alignment") of body, breath, and mind. As such, qigong is viewed by practitioners as being more than common physical exercise, because qigong combines postural, breathing, and mental training in one to produce a particular psychophysiological state of being. While CMQ is still based on traditional and classical theory, modern practitioners also emphasize the importance of a strong scientific basis. According to the 2013 CMQ textbook, physiological effects of qigong are numerous, and include improvement of respiratory and cardiovascular function, and possibly neurophysiological function.

Conventional medicine
Especially since the 1990s, conventional or mainstream Western medicine often strives to heed the model of evidence-based medicine, EBM, which demotes medical theory, clinical experience, and physiological data to prioritize the results of controlled, and especially randomized, clinical trials of the treatment itself. Although some clinical trials support qigong's effectiveness in treating conditions diagnosed in Western medicine, the quality of these studies is mostly low and, overall, their results are mixed.

Integrative, complementary, and alternative medicine
Integrative medicine (IM) refers to "the blending of conventional and complementary medicines and therapies with the aim of using the most appropriate of either or both modalities to care for the patient as a whole", whereas complementary is using a non-mainstream approach together with conventional medicine, while alternative is using a non-mainstream approach in place of conventional medicine. Qigong is used by integrative medicine practitioners to complement conventional medical treatment, based on complementary and alternative medicine interpretations of the effectiveness and safety of qigong.

Scientific basis
Scientists interested in qigong have sought to describe or verify the effects of qigong, to explore mechanisms of effects, to form scientific theory with respect to qigong, and to identify appropriate research methodology for further study. In terms of traditional theory, the existence of qi has not been independently verified in an experimental setting. In any case, some researches have reported effects on pathophysiological parameters of biomedical interest.

Practitioners, uses and cautions

Recreation and popular use 
People practice qigong for many different reasons, including for recreation, exercise and relaxation, preventive medicine and self-healing, meditation and self-cultivation, and training for martial arts. Practitioners range from athletes to people with disabilities. Because it is low impact and can be done lying, sitting, or standing, qigong is accessible for people with disabilities, seniors, and people recovering from injuries.

Therapeutic use 
Therapeutic use of qigong is directed by TCM, CAM, integrative medicine, and other health practitioners. In China, where it is considered a "standard medical technique", qigong is commonly prescribed to treat a wide variety of conditions, and clinical applications include hypertension, coronary artery disease, peptic ulcers, chronic liver diseases, diabetes mellitus, obesity, menopause syndrome, chronic fatigue syndrome, insomnia, tumors and cancer, lower back and leg pain, cervical spondylosis, and myopia. Outside China qigong is used in integrative medicine to complement or supplement accepted medical treatments, including for relaxation, fitness, rehabilitation, and treatment of specific conditions. However, there is no high-quality evidence that qigong is actually effective for these conditions. Based on systematic reviews of clinical research, there is insufficient evidence for the effectiveness of using qigong as a therapy for any medical condition.

Safety and cost 
Qigong is generally viewed as safe. No adverse effects have been observed in clinical trials, such that qigong is considered safe for use across diverse populations. Cost for self-care is minimal, and cost efficiencies are high for group delivered care. Typically the cautions associated with qigong are the same as those associated with any physical activity, including risk of muscle strains or sprains, advisability of stretching to prevent injury, general safety for use alongside conventional medical treatments, and consulting with a physician when combining with conventional treatment.

Clinical research

Overview 
Although there is ongoing clinical research examining the potential health effects of qigong, there is little financial or medical incentive to support high-quality research, and still only a limited number of studies meet accepted medical and scientific standards of randomized controlled trials (RCTs). Clinical research concerning qigong has been conducted for a wide range of medical conditions, including bone density, cardiopulmonary effects, physical function, falls and related risk factors, quality of life, immune function, inflammation, hypertension, pain, and cancer treatment.

Systematic reviews 
A 2009 systematic review on the effect of qigong exercises on reducing pain concluded that "the existing trial evidence is not convincing enough to suggest that internal qigong is an effective modality for pain management."

A 2010 systematic review of the effect of qigong exercises on cancer treatment concluded "the effectiveness of qigong in cancer care is not yet supported by the evidence from rigorous clinical trials." A separate systematic review that looked at the effects of qigong exercises on various physiological or psychological outcomes found that the available studies were poorly designed, with a high risk of bias in the results. Therefore, the authors concluded, "Due to limited number of RCTs in the field and methodological problems and high risk of bias in the included studies, it is still too early to reach a conclusion about the efficacy and the effectiveness of qigong exercise as a form of health practice adopted by the cancer patients during their curative, palliative, and rehabilitative phases of the cancer journey."

A 2011 overview of systematic reviews of controlled clinical trials, Lee et al. concluded that "the effectiveness of qigong is based mostly on poor quality research" and "therefore, it would be unwise to draw firm conclusions at this stage." Although a 2010 comprehensive literature review found 77 peer-reviewed RCTs, Lee et al.'s overview of systematic reviews as to particular health conditions found problems like sample size, lack of proper control groups, with lack of blinding associated with high risk of bias.

A 2015 systematic review of the effect of qigong exercises on cardiovascular diseases and hypertension found no conclusive evidence for effect. Also in 2015, a systemic review into the effects on hypertension suggested that it may be effective, but that the evidence was not conclusive because of the poor quality of the trials it included, and advised more rigorous research in the future. Another 2015 systematic review of qigong on biomarkers of cardiovascular disease concluded that some trials showed favorable effects, but concludes, "Most of the trials included in this review are likely to be at high risk of bias, so we have very low confidence in the validity of the results.

Mental health 
Many claims have been made that qigong can benefit or ameliorate mental health conditions, including improved mood, decreased stress reaction, and decreased anxiety and depression. Most medical studies have only examined psychological factors as secondary goals, although various studies have shown decreases in cortisol levels, a chemical hormone produced by the body in response to stress.

China
Basic and clinical research in China during the 1980s was mostly descriptive, and few results were reported in peer-reviewed English-language journals. Qigong became known outside China in the 1990s, and clinical randomized controlled trials investigating the effectiveness of qigong on health and mental conditions began to be published worldwide, along with systematic reviews.

Challenges
Most existing clinical trials have small sample sizes and many have inadequate controls. Of particular concern is the impracticality of double blinding using appropriate sham treatments, and the difficulty of placebo control, such that benefits often cannot be distinguished from the placebo effect. Also of concern is the choice of which qigong form to use and how to standardize the treatment or amount with respect to the skill of the practitioner leading or administering treatment, the tradition of individualization of treatments, and the treatment length, intensity, and frequency.

Meditation and self-cultivation applications

Qigong is practiced for meditation and self-cultivation as part of various philosophical and spiritual traditions. As meditation, qigong is a means to still the mind and enter a state of consciousness that brings serenity, clarity, and bliss. Many practitioners find qigong, with its gentle focused movement, to be more accessible than seated meditation.

Qigong for self-cultivation can be classified in terms of traditional Chinese philosophy: Daoist, Buddhist, and Confucian.

Martial arts applications
The practice of qigong is an important component in both internal and external style Chinese martial arts. Focus on qi is considered to be a source of power as well as the foundation of the internal style of martial arts (Neijia). T'ai Chi Ch'uan, Xing Yi Quan, and Baguazhang are representative of the types of Chinese martial arts that rely on the concept of qi as the foundation. Extraordinary feats of martial arts prowess, such as the ability to withstand heavy strikes (Iron Shirt) and the ability to break hard objects (Iron Palm) are abilities attributed to qigong training.

T'ai Chi Ch'uan and qigong 
T'ai Chi Ch'uan (Taijiquan) is a widely practiced Chinese internal martial style based on the theory of taiji, closely associated with qigong, and typically involving more complex choreographed movement coordinated with breath, done slowly for health and training, or quickly for self-defense. Many scholars consider t'ai chi ch'uan to be a type of qigong, traced back to an origin in the seventeenth century. In modern practice, qigong typically focuses more on health and meditation rather than martial applications, and plays an important role in training for t'ai chi ch'uan, in particular used to build strength, develop breath control, and increase vitality ("life energy").

See also
 Taoist meditation
 Taoist philosophy
 Hua Tuo
 Wushu
 Kung fu
 Jing, Qi & Shen
 Neidan
 Neigong
 Paidagong
 Silk reeling
 Tao Yin
 Yangsheng
 Zhong Gong
 Zhan Zhuang
 Traditional Chinese medicine
 Buddhist meditation 
 Taoist Tai Chi Society
 World Tai Chi and Qigong Day
 Asahi Health

References

External links

 
Chinese martial arts
Chinese words and phrases
Meditation
Taoist philosophy
Biofield therapies
Traditional Chinese medicine
Alternative medicine
Healing